The International Federation of Hard of Hearing Young People (IFHOHYP) is an international federation for organizations of hearing impaired young people. In general, the mission of IFHOHYP is to defend and promote the rights and interests of hard of hearing youth worldwide.

IFHOHYP works closely with the International Federation of Hard of Hearing People and with EFHOH (European Federation of Hard of Hearing People). Also, IFHOHYP cooperates with the Council of Europe, where is a member of the Advisory Council on Youth for the period (2009–2011). An outcome of this cooperation are the IFHOHYP Study Sessions, in which relevant topics concerning the hearing impairment are worked. IFHOHYP is an associate member of the European Disability Forum.

Members of IFHOHYP
Members in 2010:

Notes

External links
 

Deafness rights organizations